Elsa Rigmor Skjerven (11 December 1919 –  29 October 2005) was a Norwegian politician for the Christian Democratic Party.

She was born in Oslo.

She was never elected to the Norwegian Parliament, but served in the position of deputy representative from Sør-Trøndelag during the terms 1965–1969, 1969–1973 and 1973–1977.

In 1965 Skjerven was appointed Minister of Family and Consumer Affairs in the centre-right cabinet Borten. She held the position until the Borten cabinet fell in 1971.

Skjerven was a member of Trondheim city council from 1959 to 1983, as well as a member of Sør-Trøndelag county council in 1979–1982.

References

1919 births
2005 deaths
Deputy members of the Storting
Christian Democratic Party (Norway) politicians
Ministers of Children, Equality and Social Inclusion of Norway
Politicians from Trondheim
Women members of the Storting
20th-century Norwegian women politicians
20th-century Norwegian politicians
Women government ministers of Norway